Untitled 4 Ballads (stylized as UNTITLED 4 ballads) is an extended play recorded by the Japanese J-pop group Every Little Thing, released on December 18, 2002, as their twenty-third single. It was their fifth single to top the Oricon chart.

"Nostalgia" was used as the theme song for the drama Okaasan to Issho.

Track listing
 "Unspeakable" (Words - Kaori Mochida / music - Kazuhito Kikuchi)
 "" (Song of Love)" (Words - Kaori Mochida / music - Kunio Tago)
 "" (Room)" (Words - Kaori Mochida / music - Kazuhito Kikuchi)
 "Nostalgia" (Words - Kaori Mochida / music - Kazuhito Kikuchi)
 "Unspeakable" (instrumental)
 "" (instrumental)
 "" (instrumental)
 "Nostalgia" (instrumental)

Chart positions

External links
 "Untitled 4 Ballads" information at Avex Network.
 "Untitled 4 Ballads" information at Oricon.

2002 EPs
Every Little Thing (band) songs
Oricon Weekly number-one singles
Avex Trax albums